Bohara is a village in the district of Shaheed Bhagat Singh Nagar in Punjab, India. It is a small village which lies between Aur and Nawashahr.

History 
The village of Bohara was founded by two brothers Baba Fateh Singh Uppal and Baba Heera Singh Uppal, originally from Bohara's neighbouring village, Mirpur Lakha, over 200 years ago.

Geography 
Bohara's neighbouring villages are Mirpur Lakha and Sodhian, both of which are larger in size. Other larger surrounding villages include Aur and Rahon.

In the village 
There is a Uppal dairy farm which has been announced as Punjab's 3rd largest dairy farm. Within the village there is a gurdwara, post office, shops, school, volleyball ground and a bus stop.

Villages in Shaheed Bhagat Singh Nagar district